Stanko Luka Karaman (8 December 1889 – 17 May 1959) was a Yugoslav biologist of Bosnian Serb ancestry, researcher on amphipod and isopod crustaceans.

In 1926 he founded the Museum of South Serbia (later - Macedonian Museum of Natural History) in Skopje and in 1928, the Zoological Garden of Skopje.

Several species are named after him, for example Delamarella karamani Petkovski, 1957 (Harpacticoida), Stygophalangium karamani Oudemans, 1933 (Arachnida), or Macedonethes stankoi I. Karaman, 2003 (Isopoda).

Other taxa named karamani are labeled after his son Gordan S. Karaman, also a carcinologist.

Publications
 Pisces Macedoniae, Split 1924 pp. 90
 Komarci Dalmacije i njihovo suzbijanje.- Glasnik Ministarstva narodnog zdravlja, Institut za proucavanje i suzbijanje malarije Trogir, Split, 1925, pp. 1–40.

References
Tjärnö Marine Biological Laboratory: Biographical Etymology of Marine Organism Names
Karaman, Ivo (2003): Macedonethes stankoi n. sp., a rhithral oniscidean isopod (Isopoda: Oniscidea: Trichoniscidae) from Macedonia. Organisms Diversity & Evolution 3(3): Electronic Supplement 8: 1-15. PDF

1889 births
1959 deaths
Carcinologists
Scientists from Sarajevo
Yugoslav zoologists